Benjamín Borasi (born 11 November 1997) is an Argentine professional footballer who plays as a forward for Flandria, on loan from Sarmiento.

Career
Borasi began in the youth set-up of El Huracán Rojas in 2004, where he remained until 2016 when he signed for Sarmiento. He made the move into senior football in March 2019, playing the full duration of a Copa Argentina defeat to Primera B Metropolitana's All Boys at the Estadio Julio Humberto Grondona on 27 March. In January 2022, Borasi was loaned out to Primera Nacional club CSD Flandria for one year.

Career statistics
.

References

External links

1997 births
Living people
People from Rojas Partido
Argentine people of Italian descent
Argentine footballers
Association football forwards
Club Atlético Sarmiento footballers
Flandria footballers
Sportspeople from Buenos Aires Province